Michael David Stringfellow (born 27 January 1943 in Kirkby-in-Ashfield, Nottinghamshire) is an English retired footballer who played 14 seasons as a winger for Leicester City in the 1960s and 1970s. He is the uncle of fellow footballer Ian Stringfellow.

Stringfellow began his career at Mansfield Town whom he joined as a schoolboy in 1957. He was a star in Mansfield's youth team, and signed a professional contract in February 1960, shortly after his 17th birthday. He made his first-team debut six months later, playing as an outside-left in the game against Rochdale on 30 August 1960.

Despite his young age, Stringfellow remained a regular in the Mansfield Town side, and scored 12 goals in 65 appearances for the Stags, before moving to Leicester City for £25,000 in January 1962 – the highest transfer fee ever paid for an 18-year-old at the time.

By his second season at Filbert Street, Stringfellow was a regular in the Leicester side. He was a member of the Leicester side that lost against Manchester United in the 1963 FA Cup Final, and scored one of the goals when the Foxes won the League Cup the following season with a 4–3 aggregate win against Stoke City.

In 1968, Stringfellow's career was curtailed by a serious cartilage injury. Nevertheless, he remained on Leicester's books, mostly in a reserve role, until 1975 when he quit the professional game and finished his career with non-league Nuneaton Borough. In all competitions, Stringfellow played 377 games for Leicester and scored 98 goals.

After his retirement from football, Stringfellow settled in Enderby, Leicestershire, where he worked as a newsagent.

References

1943 births
Living people
English footballers
Mansfield Town F.C. players
Leicester City F.C. players
Nuneaton Borough F.C. players
People from Kirkby-in-Ashfield
Footballers from Nottinghamshire
Association football midfielders
People from Enderby, Leicestershire
Footballers from Leicestershire
FA Cup Final players